North Dome is a granite dome in Yosemite National Park, California. It can be reached by trail from the Tioga Pass Road, or by going up the Yosemite Falls trail and heading east. It can also be reached from Mirror Lakes by the Snow Creek Falls trail going north around Indian Rock and then south again on the Tioga Pass Road trail. The South Face is precipitous.

References 

Granite domes of Yosemite National Park
Mountains of Mariposa County, California
Hills of California